This article shows all participating team squads at the Intercontinental Qualification Tournament for the 2020 Men's Olympic Volleyball Tournament, held in various cities from 9–11 August 2019.

Pool A

The following is the Brazilian roster in the 2019 Intercontinental Olympic Qualification Tournament.

Head Coach: Renan Dal Zotto

The following is the Bulgarian roster in the 2019 Intercontinental Olympic Qualification Tournament.

Head Coach: Silvano Prandi

The following is the Egyptian roster in the 2019 Intercontinental Olympic Qualification Tournament.

Head Coach: Gido Vermeulen

The following is the Puerto Rican roster in the 2019 Intercontinental Olympic Qualification Tournament.

Head coach: Oswald Antonetti

Pool B

The following is the Belgian roster in the 2019 Intercontinental Olympic Qualification Tournament.

Head coach: Brecht Van Kerckhove

The following is the Dutch roster in the 2019 Intercontinental Olympic Qualification Tournament.

Head coach: Roberto Piazza

The following is the South Korean roster in the 2019 Intercontinental Olympic Qualification Tournament.

Head coach: Im Do-heon

The following is the American roster in the 2019 Intercontinental Olympic Qualification Tournament.

Head Coach: John Speraw

Pool C

The following is the Australian roster in the 2019 Intercontinental Olympic Qualification Tournament.

Head Coach: Mark Lebedew

The following is the Cameroonian roster in the 2019 Intercontinental Olympic Qualification Tournament.

Head Coach: Blaise Mayam Reniof

The following is the Italian roster in the 2019 Intercontinental Olympic Qualification Tournament.

Head Coach: Gianlorenzo Blengini

The following is the Serbian roster in the 2019 Intercontinental Olympic Qualification Tournament.

Head Coach: Nikola Grbić

Pool D

The following is the French roster in the 2019 Intercontinental Olympic Qualification Tournament.

Head Coach: Laurent Tillie

The following is the Polish roster in the 2019 Intercontinental Olympic Qualification Tournament.

Head Coach: Vital Heynen

The following is the Slovenian roster in the 2019 Intercontinental Olympic Qualification Tournament.

Head Coach: Alberto Giuliani

The following is the Tunisian roster in the 2019 Intercontinental Olympic Qualification Tournament.

Head Coach: Antonio Giaccobe

Pool E

The following is the Cuban roster in the 2019 Intercontinental Olympic Qualification Tournament.

Head Coach: Nicolas Vives

The following is the Iranian roster in the 2019 Intercontinental Olympic Qualification Tournament.

Head Coach: Igor Kolakovic

The following is the Mexican roster in the 2019 Intercontinental Olympic Qualification Tournament.

Head Coach: Jorge Miguel Azair Lopez

The following is the Russian roster in the 2019 Intercontinental Olympic Qualification Tournament.

Head Coach: Tuomas Sammelvuo

Pool F

The following is the Argentine roster in the 2019 Intercontinental Olympic Qualification Tournament.

Head Coach: Marcelo Mendez

The following is the Canadian roster in the 2019 Intercontinental Olympic Qualification Tournament.

Head Coach: Glenn Hoag

The following is the Chinese roster in the 2019 Intercontinental Olympic Qualification Tournament.

Head Coach: Raúl Lozano

The following is the Finnish roster in the 2019 Intercontinental Olympic Qualification Tournament.

Head Coach: Joel Banks

References

External links

Squads
Volleyball qualification for the Summer Olympics
Volleyball qualification for the 2020 Summer Olympics